Eday may refer to:

Eday, one of the Orkney Islands in the United Kingdom
eDay, an electronic waste initiative in New Zealand
eDay (online retail), the peak sales day for the online retail sector in the United States
E-Day, a military designation
the ICAO airport code for Strausberg Airfield, near Berlin, Germany.
Niño Martin Eday, Filipino mountain biker